Peđa Grbin (born 24 May 1979) is a Croatian lawyer and politician serving as President of the Social Democratic Party since 2020. He was also Leader of the Opposition from 2020 until 2022, when he was replaced by Davorko Vidović, the leader of the newly-established Social Democrats. He has represented VIII electoral district in the Croatian Parliament since 2011.

He also served as the Chairman of the Parliament's Committee on the Constitution, Standing Orders and Political System from 2012 until 2015. He was vice president of the SDP from 2016 to 2018 when he was suspended from that position.

Early life, education and professional career
Grbin attended elementary and high school in Pula, after which he enrolled in the Zagreb Faculty of Law from which he graduated in 2003. During elementary and high school days he played basketball for the local basketball team Gradine Pula. After graduating, Grbin worked as a trainee in a law office and afterwards as an attorney from 2006 to 2011.

Political career
After serving as a city councilor and a member of the municipal executive council in Pula, Grbin successfully ran in 2011 parliamentary election, and was elected to the Parliament in the VIII electoral district. He was reelected in 2015.

Early career
Grbin joined SDP in 1998, and soon after that entered SDP Youth Forum where he was secretary general from 2001 to 2002. After graduating from law school he returned to Pula where he served first as a member of the municipal executive council from 2005 to 2009 and then as a city councilor from 2009 to 2013. Grbin was elected to the head committee of SDP in 2004 and has been a member of that party governing body until 2016 when he was elected to the party presidency. In July 2018, he and three other members of the SDP presidency were suspended from their positions because of their criticism of the way party president Davor Bernardić led SDP. Their suspensions were partially lifted in October 2019.

Parliamentary career
In 2011 parliamentary election, Grbin was elected in the Croatian Parliament for the first time. After Josip Leko was elected to the position of Speaker of Croatian Parliament, Grbin was elected to the position of Chairman of the Committee on the Constitution, Standing Orders and Political System of the Croatian Parliament, where he served until the end of 2015. During his tenure as a committee chairman, Grbin was responsible for the preparation and adoption of the Act on the Co-Operation of the Croatian Parliament and the Government of the Republic of Croatian in European Affairs, new Standing Orders of the Croatian Parliament and 2015 amendments to Act on Election of Representatives to the Croatian Parliament.

Grbin was reelected to Croatian Parliament in 2015 parliamentary election and again in 2016 parliamentary election, where he served as a Deputy Chairman of the Committee on the Constitution, Standing Orders and Political System of the Croatian Parliament.

On 3 October 2020, Grbin was elected president of the Social Democratic Party (SDP).

References

Social Democratic Party of Croatia politicians
People from Pula
Living people
1979 births
People from Istria
Representatives in the modern Croatian Parliament